The Italy women's national ball hockey team is the women's national ball hockey team of Italy, and a member of the International Street and Ball Hockey Federation (ISBHF). The current team captain is Canadian-born Christina D'Ambrogio, who is of Italian heritage and once competed in NCAA women's ice hockey with the Holy Cross Crusaders.

World Championships
Italy made its world championship debut at the 2013 world championship, hosted in St. John's, Newfoundland, Canada, finishing with a 1–2–0 record. Diana Brown was the head coach for Italy's inaugural entry in the ball hockey worlds, with Michel Bodaly served as an assistant coach. Serving as team captain at the 2013 Worlds was Flora Fioccola (Pannunzio), who served as Team Italia's general manager at the 2015 Worlds. As a side note, Brown would serve as the head coach for Team Canada in a gold medal effort at the 2015 ISBHF Women's Worlds, also winning a Canadian national championship with the Toronto Shamrocks in the same calendar year.

Italy's first game was played against USA on June 4, 2013, losing in a 3–2 final. Of note, the starting goaltender for said game was Danielle Orgera, while Annalisa Mazzarello scored the first-ever goal for Italy in international play.

The first international victory took place in the same tournament against Switzerland on June 15, 2013, at Mount Pearl Glacier Arena, a 2–1 victory. Trina Pirone was the starting goaltender in said game, while Lisa (Elisabetta) Carnavale scored the game's first goal on a first-period power play, with Lianne Foti registering the assist. The game-winning tally was scored in the third period by Christina Carney. Carney and Jen Mormile would finish the tournament as Italy's leading scorers.

Goaltender Danielle Orgera would register Italy's first shutout in team history at the 2013 tournament, blanking Great Britain in a 6–0 final. She would finish the tournament with a 3.23 goals against average.

At the 2015 world championship Italy managed a respectable fifth-place finish. Nicole Corriero, one of several Italian-Canadians on the roster, an alumnus with the Harvard Crimson women's ice hockey program was Italy's leading scorer at the 2015 event, ranking tenth overall in scoring with eight points. Goaltender Trina Pirone would lead all goaltenders at the 2015 tournament with 103 saves and 118 shots on goal. Kori Cheverie, who plays ice hockey for the Toronto Furies of the CWHL, led the tournament in penalty minutes with 34. As a side note, Cheverie was one of two CWHL players that suited up for Team Italia in 2015, joined by Liz Knox of the Brampton Thunder.

Their biggest victory in tournament history would take place on June 23, 2015, a 6–2 final vs. Switzerland. Frances Russo would open the scoring for Italy, while Nicole Corriero would finish with a two-goal performance. Other goals were scored by Michelle Perosin-Durante, Kori Cheverie and Annalisa Mazzarello.

Rankings

All-time World Championship records

All-time record against other nations
As of August 2016

Awards and honors
 Alicia Furletti Blomberg, 2017 Ball Hockey World Championship All-Tournament Team Selection

References

External links
 ISBHF Official Site
 Women's World Championships

Ball hockey
Ball hockey